Avenida Bucareli, often referred to as "Bucareli Street", is a main avenue and eje vial (arterial road) in Mexico City. It divides the Historic center on the east from Colonia Juárez on the west. It is named after the viceroy of New Spain, Antonio María de Bucareli y Ursúa, who commissioned it. Built in the late 18th century and called Paseo Nuevo, it was once a wide boulevard lined with more than 1000 ash trees. In the 19th century the walking paths on either side were built upon and the avenue acquired its current width. It originally had three plazas, each with a fountain. Only one fountain survives, though it was moved to Plaza Loreto.

Points of interest
Paseo de la Reforma, Bucareli's northern end, the Glorieta del Caballito, where the Equestrian statue of Charles IV of Spain once stood
Excélsior (1923) and El Universal newspaper buildings
Café La Habana, opened in 1954
Reloj Chino (Chinese clock)
Edificio Gaona (1922) 
Secretariat of the Interior
Edificio Vizcaya at #128
Conjunto Mascota, workers' apartments along interior streets, developed by the founder of El Buen Tono cigarette company, and constructed by Miguel Ángel de Quevedo.
Mercado Juárez, the local market for Colonia Juárez
Avenida Chapultepec, southern end of Bucareli

References

External links
Avenida Bucareli, Ciudad de México en el tiempo (Mexico City through the ages), television program
"Bucareli, antiguos esplendores en la calle de las ratas" (Bucareli, old splendor in the street of rats), El Correo

Bucareli